Andrew MacGregor Childs is an American computer scientist and physicist known for his work on quantum computing.
He is currently a Professor in the Department of Computer Science and Institute for Advanced Computer Studies at the University of Maryland. He also co-directs the Joint Center for Quantum Information and Computer Science, a partnership between the University of Maryland and the National Institute of Standards and Technology.

Biography 

Andrew Childs received a doctorate in physics from MIT in 2004, advised by Edward Farhi. His thesis was on Quantum Information Processing in Continuous Time. After completing his Ph.D., Childs was a DuBridge Postdoctoral Scholar at the Institute for Quantum Information at the California Institute of Technology from 2004 to 2007.  From 2007 to 2014, he was a faculty member in the Department of Combinatorics and Optimization and the Institute for Quantum Computing at the University of Waterloo. Childs joined the University of Maryland in 2014.  He is also a senior fellow of the Canadian Institute for Advanced Research.

Research 
Childs is known for his work on quantum computing, especially on the development of quantum algorithms. He helped to develop the concept of a quantum walk leading to an example of exponential quantum speedup and algorithms for spatial search, formula evaluation, and universal computation. He also developed quantum algorithms for algebraic problems and for simulating quantum systems.

Selected works

References

External links 
 Childs's homepage
 Joint Center for Quantum Information and Computer Science

21st-century American physicists
California Institute of Technology alumni
MIT Center for Theoretical Physics alumni
American computer scientists
University of Maryland, College Park faculty
Year of birth missing (living people)
Living people
Quantum information scientists
MIT Department of Physics alumni